Susan or Sue White may refer to:
Susan Clarencieux, née White, lady-in-waiting to Mary I of England
Sue Shelton White (died 1943), suffragist from Henderson, Tennessee
Susan Dorothea White (born 1941), artist
Sue White, a character in the British sitcom Green Wing